The Ancient Art of War in the Skies is a video game developed by Evryware in 1992 for MS-DOS as a sequel to The Ancient Art of War and The Ancient Art of War at Sea. In 1993 conversions were published for Amiga and Atari ST.

Gameplay
In The Ancient Art of War in the Skies, the player plays either the British or German forces in World War I. In this air combat simulation, the player makes aerial assaults against opponents such as Lord Kitchener, Ferdinand Foch, Kaiser Wilhelm II, fictional enemy Helmut von Spike, or even Sun Tzu.

The game acts in two dimensions. In the first one the player spends most of its time on the overhead map. They can plan the strategy and set the goals and routes for aircraft. In the second one, when the aircraft reaches its destination, the game switches to an arcade section. There are also two: a side-scrolling dog fights where the goal is to destroy the enemy aircraft shooting at them and overhead bombings where the player has to release bombs at the marked targets. Arcade sequences can be skipped and dealt by computer's calculations based on different variables.

Reception
The game was reviewed in 1993 in Dragon #190 by Hartley, Patricia, and Kirk Lesser in "The Role of Computers" column. The reviewers gave the game 3 out of 5 stars. Computer Gaming World called it "a cute combination of strategy and action gaming" that would not likely appeal to fans of flight simulators or wargames. A 1993 survey in the magazine of wargames gave the game three-plus stars out of five.

Reviews
ST Format - Sep, 1993
Amiga Games - Jun, 1993
PC Games (Germany) - Jan, 1993
PC Player (Germany) - Mar, 1993
Computer Gaming World - Sep, 1993

References

External links
 The Ancient Art of War in the Skies at Atari Mania
The Ancient Art of War in the Skies at Amiga Hall of Light

1992 video games
Amiga games
Atari ST games
Cultural depictions of Herbert Kitchener, 1st Earl Kitchener
Cultural depictions of Manfred von Richthofen
Cultural depictions of Wilhelm II
DOS games
Evryware games
MicroProse games
Single-player video games
Video games based on real people
Video games developed in the United States
Video games scored by Jeff Briggs